The following is a list of the 124 communes of the department of Corse-du-Sud, Corsica, France.

The communes cooperate in the following intercommunalities (as of 2020):
Communauté d'agglomération du Pays Ajaccien
Communauté de communes de l'Alta Rocca
Communauté de communes Celavu-Prunelli
Communauté de communes de la Pieve de l'Ornano et du Taravo
Communauté de communes du Sartenais Valinco Taravo
Communauté de communes Spelunca-Liamone
Communauté de communes du Sud Corse

References

Lists of communes of France